In mathematics, negacyclic convolution is a convolution between two vectors a and b.

It is also called skew circular convolution or wrapped convolution. It results from multiplication of a skew circulant matrix, generated by vector a, with vector b.

See also 
Circular convolution theorem

Bilinear maps
Functional analysis
Image processing